S'acqua 'e is dolus is an excavation in the rocks, a so-called Domu de janas (house of the fairies),
in the neighbourhood of Settimo San Pietro, Province of Cagliari, Sardinia, Italy, constructed in the period 3400-2700 BC.

It consists of two rooms connected by an opening of less than a metre, just like the main entrance.
Water from a nearby source enters the rooms and according to a popular tradition, not only is the water 
safe for drinking, but it also heals pain, from which comes the name of the cave "water that heals pain".

According to popular legend, Saint Peter stayed over at the cave and prayed so long that he left
the imprints of his knees in the rocks. In the past, this was celebrated on the 29th of June
with a mass a benediction of the water. Nowadays it is celebrated the first days of September.

External links
 Scheda Archeologia - Domus de Janas - Comune di Settimo San Pietro (CA)

Buildings and structures in Sardinia
Archaeological sites in Sardinia
Tourist attractions in Sardinia